Annemessex is a word referring to many aspects of the lower Somerset County, Maryland area. It may refer to:

 Annemessex people, an Indigenous people in Maryland
 The Big Annemessex River, a tributary of the Chesapeake Bay
 The Little Annemessex River, which flows through Crisfield, Maryland
 Annemessex Neck, the original name for Crisfield, Maryland prior to European colonization